Catfish Rising is the 18th studio album by the British rock group Jethro Tull, released in 1991. It is the first Tull album to feature keyboardist Andrew Giddings. The album continues the hard rock and blues sound of the previous two albums.

Track listing

Vinyl edition

CD edition

 "Night in the Wilderness" appeared as the B-side to many Catfish Rising -era singles.
 The live version of "Jump Start" appeared as the B-side to several single releases of "This Is Not Love".

Personnel
Jethro Tull
Ian Anderson – vocals, acoustic guitar, electric guitars, acoustic mandolin, electric mandolin, flute, keyboards, drums, percussion
Martin Barre – electric guitar
Dave Pegg – acoustic bass guitar, electric bass guitar
Doane Perry – drums, percussion

Additional personnel

Andy Giddings – keyboards (on tracks 1, 4 & 8)
Foss Patterson – keyboards (on track 10)
John Bundrick – keyboards (on track 11)
Matt Pegg – bass guitar (on tracks 1, 4 & 7)
Scott Hunter - drums, percussion (on track 5)

Charts

References

Jethro Tull (band) albums
1991 albums
Chrysalis Records albums